The 2003–04 Bulgarian Hockey League season was the 52nd season of the Bulgarian Hockey League, the top level of ice hockey in Bulgaria. Four teams participated in the league, and HK Slavia Sofia won the championship.

Regular season

Playoffs

Semifinals 
 HK Slavia Sofia - Iceberg-Sulis Sofia 20:3/22:4
 HK Levski Sofia - Sinite Sofia 9:0/8:1

3rd place 
 Sinite Sofia - Iceberg-Sulis Sofia 4:3 (8:3, 2:5, 7:5, 1:6, 4:2, 3:7, 5:4)

Final 
 HK Slavia Sofia - HK Levski Sofia 4:2 (6:2, 1:3, 4:2, 3:4 SO., 4:3 OT, 5:1)

External links 
 Season on hockeyarchives.info

Bulgar
Bulgarian Hockey League seasons
Bulg